Benjamin "Benny the Boss" Tannenbaum (c. 1906 – February 6, 1941) was a New York mobster involved in narcotics and the fur rackets as well as a mob accountant for labor racketeer Louis "Lepke" Buchalter and Jacob "Gurrah" Shapiro. A friend of Bronx real estate agent Max Heitner, whom he had met at a New York summer resort, he was shot twice in the chest and killed while babysitting Heitner's four-month-old baby. Seymour "Blue Jaw" Magoon, a member of Murder, Inc., was later brought into custody for Tannenbaum's murder. It has been speculated, as he had knowledge of Charles "The Bug" Workman's role in the 1935 gangland slaying of Dutch Schultz, that Tannenbaum may have been targeted as a potential informant during District Attorney Thomas E. Dewey's prosecution against Louis Buchalter.

References

External links

1900s births
1941 deaths
1941 murders in the United States
People murdered by Murder, Inc.
Murdered Jewish American gangsters
Deaths by firearm in New York (state)
People murdered in New York (state)
Male murder victims
20th-century American Jews